John Fredriksson (30 August 1923 – 29 May 2012) was a Swedish alpine skier. He competed in three events at the 1952 Winter Olympics.

References

External links
 

1923 births
2012 deaths
Swedish male alpine skiers
Olympic alpine skiers of Sweden
Alpine skiers at the 1952 Winter Olympics
People from Åre Municipality
Sportspeople from Jämtland County
20th-century Swedish people